The Falcon Heavy test flight (also known as the Falcon Heavy demonstration mission) was the first attempt by SpaceX to launch a Falcon Heavy rocket on February 6, 2018, at 20:45 UTC. The successful test introduced the Falcon Heavy as the most powerful rocket in operation at the time, producing  of thrust and having more than twice the payload capacity of the next most powerful rocket, United Launch Alliance's Delta IV Heavy.

Preparation
In April 2011, SpaceX was planning for a first launch of Falcon Heavy from Vandenberg Air Force Base on the West Coast in 2013. It refurbished Launch Complex 4E at Vandenberg AFB to accommodate Falcon 9 and Heavy. The first launch from the Cape Canaveral East Coast launch complex was planned for late 2013 or 2014.

Due partly to the failure of SpaceX CRS-7 in June 2015, SpaceX rescheduled the maiden Falcon Heavy flight in September 2015 to occur no earlier than April 2016, but by February 2016 had postponed it again to late 2016. The flight was to be launched from the refurbished Kennedy Space Center Launch Complex 39A.

In August 2016, the demonstration flight was moved to early 2017, then to summer 2017, to late 2017 and to January 2018.

At a July 2017 meeting of the International Space Station Research and Development meeting in Washington, D.C., SpaceX CEO Elon Musk downplayed expectations for the success of the maiden flight:
There's a real good chance the vehicle won't make it to orbit ... I hope it makes it far enough away from the pad that it does not cause pad damage. I would consider even that a win, to be honest.

Musk went on to say the integration and structural challenges of combining three Falcon 9 cores were much more difficult than expected. The plan was for all three cores to land back on Earth after launch.

In December 2017, Musk tweeted that the dummy payload on the maiden Falcon Heavy launch would be his personal midnight cherry Tesla Roadster playing David Bowie's "Life on Mars", and that it would be launched into an orbit around the Sun that will take it as far out as Mars' orbit. He released pictures in the following days. The car has three cameras attached that provided "epic views".

On December 28, 2017, the Falcon Heavy was moved to the launch pad in preparation of a static fire test of all 27 engines, which was expected on January 19, 2018. However, due to the U.S. government shutdown that began on January 20, the testing and launch were further delayed.

The static fire test was conducted on January 24, 2018. Musk confirmed via Twitter that the test "was good" and announced the rocket would be launched in approximately one week.

Mission overview 
The mission was the test flight of the Falcon Heavy, intended to demonstrate the rocket's capabilities while gathering telemetry throughout the flight.

Payload 

The dummy payload for this test flight was a sports car, Tesla Roadster, owned by Elon Musk. SpaceX stated that the payload had to be "something fun and without irreplaceable sentimental value". Sitting in the driver's seat of the Roadster is "Starman", a dummy astronaut clad in a SpaceX spacesuit. It has his right hand on the steering wheel and left elbow resting on the open window sill. Starman is named for the David Bowie song "Starman". The car's sound system was looping the symbolic Bowie songs "Space Oddity" and "Life on Mars?".

It was launched with sufficient velocity to escape the Earth and enter an elliptic orbit around the Sun that crosses the orbit of Mars, reaching an aphelion (maximum distance from the Sun) of 1.66 AU. During the early portion of its voyage it functioned as a broadcast device, sending video back to Earth for four hours. The Roadster remains attached to the second stage.

This launcher demonstration made the Roadster the first consumer car sent into space. Three Lunar Roving Vehicles were sent to space on the Apollo 15, 16, and 17 missions in the 1970s, and these vehicles were left on the Moon. The Roadster is one of two formerly crewed vehicles (albeit not a crewed space vehicle) derelict in solar orbit, joining LM-4 Snoopy, Apollo 10's lunar module ascent stage.

Also, included was Arch Mission 1.2, which is a crystal disk containing Isaac Asimov's Foundation series of books, on the Tesla Roadster.

There is a copy of Douglas Adams' 1979 novel The Hitchhiker's Guide to the Galaxy in the glovebox, along with references to the book in the form of a towel and a sign on the dashboard that reads "". A Hot Wheels miniature Roadster with a miniature Starman is mounted on the dashboard.  A plaque bearing the names of the employees who worked on the project is underneath the car, and a message on the vehicle's circuit board reads "Made on Earth by humans".

Rocket configuration
Falcon Heavy flew in its reusable configuration, allowing for a landing approach of both side boosters and the central core.
The side boosters consisted of two previously flown Falcon 9 first stages, being reused from the CRS-9 mission in July 2016 and the Thaicom 8 launch in May 2016. The central core was newly built because it needs to support stronger forces during ascent, so that a regular first stage could not be used. The upper stage was the same as on a Falcon 9.

Side boosters equipped with a nose cone have different aerodynamic properties than the usual Falcon 9 boosters with a cylindric interstage. For this reason, SpaceX equipped them with larger and sturdier grid fins made of titanium, to help guide the atmospheric descent accurately. The central core, however, still used conventional aluminum grid fins, as its aerodynamic properties are very similar to those of a conventional Falcon 9 first stage.

The Roadster was mounted on the second stage using a custom-made payload adapter, and was encapsulated in a conventional fairing. Falcon Heavy also supports the launch of Dragon capsules without a fairing.

Objectives 

The Falcon Heavy maiden flight was intended to accomplish several objectives: 
 launch the Falcon Heavy from the pad through the atmosphere, including Max Q flight phase;
 separate the side booster cores from the continuing first stage center core and upper stage
 return the two side boosters to Cape Canaveral and land them simultaneously at Landing Zones 1 and 2
 separate the center core and light the upper stage to orbit insertion
 land the central first stage booster core on an autonomous spaceport drone ship, the Of Course I Still Love You, in the Atlantic Ocean
 relight the upper stage to orbit in the Van Allen belts for several hours to show radiation resistance
 relight the upper stage again to put the payload into its heliocentric orbit, demonstrating a lifetime for the upper stage suitable for geosynchronous orbit insertion.

The purpose of including the Roadster on the maiden flight was to demonstrate that the Falcon Heavy can launch payloads as far as the orbit of Mars, and it exceeded its projected route by extending its aphelion to near the asteroid belt beyond Mars (with a perihelion at the level of Earth's orbit), but did not test or demonstrate the separation of the second stage and a payload.

Flight timeline

After a delay of over two hours due to high winds, the launch occurred at 3:45 PM EST, or 20:45 UTC, from Launch Complex 39A at Kennedy Space Center at Cape Canaveral, Florida; the Roadster was successfully placed in its orbit, and its two booster cores returned to land at Landing Zones 1 and 2 several minutes later. The sole objective not completed was the landing of the central core; while its fate was initially ambiguous due to signal loss and heavy smoke, Musk confirmed several hours after the launch that the booster had not survived the recovery attempt. Because two of the three engines necessary to land were unable to reignite, the booster hit the water at 500 kilometres per hour, 100 metres away from the drone ship. The final upper stage transfer burn to solar orbit produced an orbit that will be beyond the orbit of Mars at its furthest point from the sun.

As the launch was a success, most planned events took place in the planned point of time. As the central core landing burn wasn't performed correctly, the exact time of the landing attempt is not known.

The mission timeline was (all times approximate):

In the above table, events are colour coded.

Outcome

Launch

Although Elon Musk had publicly declared that there is a 50-50 chance of success, the rocket performed nominally and launched on schedule, followed by nominal separation of the side-boosters (first stage), and soon after, by the central core booster (second stage). Valuable telemetry data on the performance of the launch system and its components were  obtained for all stages of the test flight.

Boosters

Both boosters successfully landed almost simultaneously on the ground at Landing Zones 1 and 2 at Cape Canaveral Air Force Station. As the boosters were from an older generation of the Falcon 9 booster, SpaceX has ruled out using any of their major parts for a third mission. Due to the high cost and lengthy manufacturing process of the grid fins, however, those were reused on future flights.

Central core
The central core attempted to return to the autonomous spaceport drone ship "Of Course I Still Love You" but failed to light two of the three engines during the landing burn. According to Elon Musk on the post-flight conference, the central core ran out of triethylaluminum-triethylborane (TEA-TEB) igniter fluid. Musk later stated that the fix to this problem was "pretty obvious", which led many to believe SpaceX was simply going to add more ignition fluid on future missions. As SpaceX was phasing out Block 3 and starting the transition to only use Block 5 hardware for future Falcon 9 launches, the Block 3 center core loss did not impact future SpaceX operations.

Final stage

The second stage fired three times before placing the dummy payload in a heliocentric orbit, with an aphelion of 1.66 AU, beyond Mars. The payload has an orbital period of 1.53 years. The first four hours of the flight were streamed live on YouTube.  The last image released to the public was taken after the second stage finished burning all of its fuel, and showed Starman leaving Earth behind.  Batteries were expected to last about 12 hours. NASA added the second stage to its database for tracking Solar System objects, and it is not expected to make any close encounters with Earth before 2091.

Reactions 

With over 2.3 million viewers seeing the launch live, the webcast of the Falcon Heavy test flight is the second most watched livestream ever on YouTube, a viewing rate only surpassed by Red Bull Stratos in 2012. Approximately 100,000 people watched the launch from Cape Canaveral. This launch also won both the SpaceNews's Award and Readers' Choice's Award of Breakthrough of the Year in 2018.

U.S. President Donald Trump tweeted:  

Former NASA Deputy Administrator Lori Garver advocated the cancellation of the Space Launch System program as a consequence of the success of this demonstration.

Later, Elon Musk released a video highlighting the flight, and thanking fans.

Gallery

Footnotes

References

External links 

 SpaceX:  (6 February 2018) live broadcast feed
 SpaceX:  (6 February 2018) live broadcast feed from the Tesla Roadster in orbit
 SpaceX:  (24 January 2018) static fire test of Falcon Heavy #1
 SpaceX:  (5 February 2018) animated simulated flight 1 of Falcon Heavy
 NASA Kennedy Space Center: "Rocket Launch: February 6, 2018 | SpaceX Falcon Heavy Inaugural Flight"
 Elon Musk: "A Red Car for the Red Planet" on Instagram (22 December 2017)

2018 in Florida
2018 in spaceflight
Falcon Heavy
February 2018 events in the United States
Test spaceflights
Rocket launches in 2018